James Macpherson (1736–1796) was a Scottish poet.

James Macpherson may also refer to:
 James MacPherson (actor) (born 1960), Scottish actor who starred in ITV drama Taggart
 James MacPherson (American football) (born 1980), American football player
 James Macpherson (trade unionist) (died 1932), British trade unionist and political activist
 (James) Ian Macpherson, 1st Baron Strathcarron (1880–1937), British lawyer and politician
 Jim Macpherson (born 1966), American drummer in various rock acts
 Jamie Macpherson (1675–1700), Scottish outlaw
 James C. MacPherson, justice of the Court of Appeal for Ontario
 James Philip Macpherson, Australian politician and pastoralist in the colony of Victoria
 James MacPherson, a character in the television series Warehouse 13

See also 
 James McPherson (disambiguation)